This is a list of members of Spain's eighth Congress of Deputies.

External links 
 Congreso de los Diputados

08